Krystian Godfryd Deybel de Hammerau (1725–1798) was a Polish military commander and a general of artillery. He fought during the Warsaw Uprising of 1794 and commanded the artillery of Kościuszko's Uprising.

Born to a family of Polonized German aristocracy of Saxon origin, Deybel joined the Royal Cadet Corps in 1740. In 1750 he was sent to Dresden, where he studied artillery tactics. Upon his return to Poland in 1753 he joined the Royal Artillery and served with distinction at various posts, rising to the rank of pułkownik.

During the Warsaw Uprising, Deybel was the commanding officer of the Warsaw Arsenal and was responsible for aiding the Polish forces expelling the Russian occupation force from the city. For his actions, he was promoted to the rank of Major General on May 18, 1794. Although over 70 at that point, he remained in the Polish Army until the end of hostilities.

References

 
 

1725 births
1798 deaths
Military personnel from Warsaw
Polish generals
Generals of the Polish–Lithuanian Commonwealth